Proadifen (SKF-525A) is a non-selective inhibitor of cytochrome P450 enzymes, preventing some types of drug metabolism. It is also an inhibitor of neuronal nitric oxide synthase (NOS), CYP-dependent (cytochrome P450-dependent) arachidonate metabolism, transmembrane calcium influx, and platelet thromboxane synthesis. Further documented effects include the blockade of ATP-sensitive inward rectifier potassium channel 8 (KIR6.1), and stimulation of endothelial cell prostacyclin production.

Proadifen exerts apoptotic/anti-proliferate (tumour suppressing) effects in certain forms of cancer (HT-29 colon adenocarcinoma), believed to be caused by mediation of glycogen synthase kinase 3 β (GSK-3β). In the same study administration of proadifen was demonstrated to produce time- and dose-dependent phosphatidylserine externalization, caspase-3 activation and PARP cleavage. Intense upregulation of NAG-1 and ATF3 and downregulation of Mcl-1 and Egr-1 were also observed.

Proadifen has been demonstrated to normally inhibit the nicotinic acetylcholine receptor (NAChR) and muscarinic acetylcholine receptor (MAChR) in rats.

References

External links

Carboxylate esters
Cytochrome P450 inhibitors
Diethylamino compounds